There are a number of Unix-like operating systems under active development, descended from the Berkeley Software Distribution (BSD) series of UNIX variants developed (originally by Bill Joy) at the University of California, Berkeley Electrical Engineering and Computer Science department.  there were four major BSD operating systems, and an increasing number of other OSs derived from these, that add or remove certain features but generally remain compatible with their originating OS—and so are not really forks of them. This is a list of those that have been active since 2014, and their websites.

FreeBSD-based
FreeBSD is a free Unix-like operating system descended from AT&T UNIX via the Berkeley Software Distribution (BSD). FreeBSD currently has more than 200 active developers and thousands of contributors. Other notable derivatives include DragonFly BSD, which was forked from FreeBSD 4.8, and Apple Inc.'s macOS, with its Darwin base including a large amount of code derived from FreeBSD.

DragonFly BSD-based

NetBSD-based
NetBSD is a freely redistributable, open source version of the Unix-derivative Berkeley Software Distribution (BSD) computer operating system. It was the second open source BSD descendant to be formally released, after 386BSD, and continues to be actively developed. Noted for its portability and quality of design and implementation, it is often used in embedded systems and as a starting point for the porting of other operating systems to new computer architectures.

OpenBSD-based
OpenBSD is a Unix-like computer operating system descended from Berkeley Software Distribution (BSD), a Unix derivative developed at the University of California, Berkeley. It was forked from NetBSD in 1995. OpenBSD includes a number of security features absent or optional in other operating systems and has a tradition of developers auditing the source code for software bugs and security problems.

Historic BSD

BSD was originally derived from Unix, using the complete source code for Sixth Edition Unix for the PDP-11 from Bell Labs as a starting point for the First Berkeley Software Distribution, or 1BSD. A series of updated versions for the PDP-11 followed (the 2.xBSD releases). A 32-bit version for the VAX platform was released as 3BSD, and the 4.xBSD series added many new features, including TCP/IP networking.

For many years, the primary developer and project leader was Bill Joy, who was a graduate student at the time; funding for this project was provided by DARPA.  DARPA was interested in obtaining a programming platform and programmer's interface which would provide a robust, general purpose, time-sharing computing platform which would not become obsolete every time computing hardware was or is replaced.  Such an operating system would allow US Department of Defense software, especially for intricate, long-term finance and logistics operations, to be quickly ported to new hardware as it became available.

As time went on, code was later ported both from and to Unix System III and still later Unix System V. Unix System V Revision 4 (SVR4), released circa 1992, contained much code which was ported from BSD version up to and including 4.3BSD.

See also

 Comparison of BSD operating systems
 Commercial products based on FreeBSD

References

External links
 MiniOS - List of small OSes, with a section on BSD-based ones
 - MaheshaBSD in the BSD Magazine
 StarBSD

List
Lightweight Unix-like systems
BSD operating systems
BSD